Diaphorobacter ruginosibacter is a Gram-negative and non-endospores-forming bacterium from the genus of Diaphorobacter which has been isolated from root nodule of soybean plant near Baoji in China.

References 

Comamonadaceae
Bacteria described in 2015